O Teri is a 2014 Indian Hindi-language comedy film directed by Umesh Bisht and produced by Atul Agnihotri and Alvira Khan Agnihotri. It stars Pulkit Samrat, Bilal Amrohi, Sarah-Jane Dias, and Mandira Bedi. The film follows two journalists who come across a big scam. Upon its release on 28 March 2014, the film received generally negative reviews, and emerged a commercial failure.

Plot
Prantabh Pratap aka PP (Pulkit Samrat) and Anand Ishwaram Devdutt Subramanium/AIDS (Bilal Amrohi) are two journalists and roommates. Their boss Monsoon (Sarah-Jane Dias) always insults them for the horrid quality of their work. She never believes them and threatens to fire them from their jobs if they lie to her. One day PP and AIDS discover CBI Officer Avinash Tripathi's dead body in their car and attempt to take it to their office. However, by the time PP and AIDS have found Monsoon, the dead body has vanished causing Monsoon to think PP and AIDS lied and hence she fires them from their jobs. Frustrated, one day PP and AIDS are walking on a bridge which somehow collapses on the highway. On the news some people suggest the reason for the collapse could be a sonic boom, no blessings or the screw driver not inserted. PP and AIDS somehow discover that the dead body had caused the bridge to fall. The police take it away from them and later they end up with a CD that could expose a corrupt politician. The politicians chase PP and AIDS into a warehouse where eventually the police arrives and Monsoon realises that the men were telling the truth all this while. The politicians get arrested and PP and AIDS become nationwide heroes.

Cast 
Pulkit Samrat as Prantabh Pratap/P.P.
Bilal Amrohi as Anand Ishwaram Devdutt Subramanium/AIDS
 Kuldeep sareen as Dead man
Sarah-Jane Dias as Monsoon Krishnacharya
Mandira Bedi as Sherry (Special Guest)
Ajay Berry as Jagan
Vijay Raaz as Bhanwar Singh Kilol (Opposition Leader)
Anupam Kher as Bilal Khawaja (Asian Olympics Games Chairman)
Manoj Pahwa as L. Chadhha
Murali Sharma as Nata
Himani Shivpuri as Pratap‘s mother 
Sidharth Bhardwaj as Police Constable 
Sara Loren as Self
Razak Khan as Dhaba Owner 
Jatin Sarna as Drunk Police Officer
Denzil Smith as Murli Manohar Mahapatra
Blake Curtis - Woodcock as Title Song Item Girl
Mohan Kapur as Newspaper Editor 
Salman Khan – special appearance in the titular song O Teri

Location 
The movie was shot primarily at the Mindmill Corporate Towers in Noida, NCR.

Box office 
The film which released alongside Dishkiyaoon and Youngistaan in approximately 1000 theatres across India saw a "poor" opening occupancy of 5-10%.

Soundtrack
Music was composed by GJ Singh, Rajiv Jhalla and Hard Kaur. Lyrics were penned by Kumaar, Abhinav Chaturvedi and Akshay K. Saxena.

References

External links 
 

2014 films
2010s Hindi-language films
Indian comedy films
Films about journalists
2014 comedy films
Hindi-language comedy films